Belpınar is a village in the Nurdağı District, Gaziantep Province, Turkey. The village is populated by Kurds and had a population of 151 in 2022.

English traveler Mark Sykes recorded the village as inhabited by Delikan Kurds in early 20th century.

References

Villages in Nurdağı District
Kurdish settlements in Gaziantep Province